"Underdog" is a song by American singer and songwriter Banks. It was released on September 28, 2017 after premiering on Zane Lowe's Beats 1 radio show. The song was written by Banks and Al Shux and produced by the latter.

Critical reception
The song received acclaim from music critics. Mike Wass of Idolator called it "surprisingly upbeat", praising it as "catchy, full of glorious pop hooks and undeniably feel-good." PopCrush called it "a commanding, almost guttural-sounding slice of stuttering electro-pop, with lines punctuated by [literal!] snarls and sharp exhalations" and "it's a nonstop showcase of brilliant melodies and Mastiff-sized hooks". Robin Murray of Clash Magazine spoke positively of the track, saying "it's a fascinating piece of multi-faceted pop [...] bright, shimmering on the surface, Banks is never afraid to delve a little deeper, adding layers of darkness to her songwriting". Shaad D'Souza of ABC Triple J described the song as a "summer jam".

Credits and personnel
Credits adapted from Tidal.
 Banks – vocals
 Al Shux – production, mixing engineering, recording engineering, synthesizer programming, programming, drums
 Chris Galland – mixing engineering
 Manny Marroquin – mixing
 Robin Florent – assistant mixing
 Scott Desmarais – assistant mixing

Charts

Release history

References

External links 
 

2017 singles
2017 songs
Banks (singer) songs
Harvest Records singles
Songs written by Al Shux
Songs written by Banks (singer)
Electropop songs